Talesh, Rezvanshahr and Masal is a single-member electoral district in the Gilan Province in Iran. The largest city in the constituency is Hashtpar.

References

See also 

Electoral districts of Gilan Province